Bibiana Aído Almagro (born 2 February 1977) is a Spanish politician who served as minister of equality. She became the first person to hold the post on 14 April 2008, at the beginning of José Luis Rodríguez Zapatero's second term as Prime Minister of Spain.

She has a bachelor's degree in international business administration from the University of Cádiz. As part of an interchange program she did part of her studies at Northumbria University's School of International Business Administration. On 14 July 2011, Bibiana Aido was awarded an honorary doctorate (Doctor of Civil Law) by Newcastle Business School, Northumbria University.

References

External links
Bibiana Aído's personal blog

1977 births
Living people
Spanish Socialist Workers' Party politicians
People from La Janda
Alumni of Northumbria University
University of Cádiz alumni
Women government ministers of Spain
21st-century Spanish women politicians
Members of the 8th Parliament of Andalusia
Spanish women economists